Al Castellanos  was a Cuban bandleader of the 1940s and 1950s. He was one of the first three acts, with Tito Puente and Tito Rodríguez, to record for Tico Records in New York. In 1955 Castellanos signed a three-year deal with leading New York Latin label Mardi Gras Records and had his first big hit "The Speak-Up Mambo".  Castellanos' orchestra was based around the La Playa Sextet.

Discography
Speak-Up,   Mardi-Gras Records		1956		
Cha Cha Cha Together 1-2-3,   	Mardi-Gras Records 		
Pachanga Si And Cha Cha Too!,  	Mardi-Gras Records		 	
Cha Cha At The Sahara , 	Mardi-Gras Records

References

Cuban bandleaders
Date of birth unknown
Year of birth missing